Anis Nagi (1939–2010) was a Pakistani poet, novelist and critic who lectured at the Government College, Faisalabad and Government College, Lahore.

Early life and education 
Nagi was born in 1939 in the Punjabi city Sheikhupura and studied at Muslim High School No 2 before attending Government College, Lahore and MA in Urdu (First Class First-Gold Medalist) from Punjab University Oriental College. He earned his PhD from the University of the Punjab.

Whilst lecturing at Government College, Faisalabad and Government College, Lahore, Nagi passed the Pakistan Civil Service exam and became a member of the 1965 batch, eventually reaching grade 21 before he retired.

Works 
Nagi was at the forefront of the Urdu Literary Movement in the 1960s and authored 79 books including poetry, novels, translations, short stories, and critical reviews. He worked on Iqbal, Manto Ghalib and Bullah Shah and was one of the pioneers of Azad Nazam and Nayee Shairie.

Death and legacy
Nagi died on 7 October 2010 in Lahore after suffering a cardiac arrest and directed that his books be donated to the Punjab Public Library.

Nagi was posthumously awarded Tamgha-e-Imtiaz by the Government of Pakistan in 2022 for his work in literature.

Selected works
 
 
 Anīs Nāgī. 1969. Shiʻrī Lassāniyāt. Lāhaur: Kitābiyāt.
 انىس ناگى and انيس ناگى. 1984. سعادت حسن منٹو. Lāhaur: جمالىات،.

References

Further reading

External links
 dailytimes.com.pk
https://web.archive.org/web/20101010194212/http://www.dawn.com/wps/wcm/connect/dawn-content-library/dawn/the-newspaper/local/lahore/anis-nagi-dies-in-harness-800 dawn.com
http://thenews.com.pk/09-10-2010/ethenews/e-9027.htm thenews.com.pk
http://www.nation.com.pk/pakistan-news-newspaper-daily-english-online/Regional/Lahore/09-Oct-2010/Qul-of-Anis-Nagi-held nation.com.pk
saadatsaeed.com  Nagi's new poetic venture
saadatsaeed.com  A Novel by Anis Nagi
the-south-asian.com  Pakistani Literature: Evolution and trends

1939 births
2010 deaths
Poets from Lahore
20th-century Pakistani poets
Urdu-language novelists
Urdu-language poets from Pakistan
Literary critics of Urdu
Pakistani literary critics